Halolaelaps is a genus of mites in the family Halolaelapidae. There are about 30 described species in Halolaelaps.

Species
These 30 species belong to the genus Halolaelaps:

 Halolaelaps aeronautus (Vitzthum, 1920)
 Halolaelaps areolatus (Leitner, 1946)
 Halolaelaps balticus Willmann, 1957
 Halolaelaps celticus Halbert, 1915
 Halolaelaps communis (Gotz, 1952)
 Halolaelaps coulsoni Gwiazdowicz & Teodorowicz, 2017
 Halolaelaps coxalis Willmann, 1957
 Halolaelaps curvisetosus (Leitner, 1946)
 Halolaelaps euxinus
 Halolaelaps fallax (Gotz, 1952)
 Halolaelaps holsaticus Vitzthum, 1931
 Halolaelaps incisus Hyatt, 1956
 Halolaelaps leitnerae (Gotz, 1952)
 Halolaelaps leptoscutatus Karg, 1971
 Halolaelaps marinus (Brady, 1875)
 Halolaelaps nodosus Berlese & Trouessart, 1889
 Halolaelaps octoclavatus (Vitzthum, 1920)
 Halolaelaps porulus (Gotz, 1952)
 Halolaelaps quadricavatus (Gotz, 1952)
 Halolaelaps remanei Willmann, 1952
 Halolaelaps saproincisus Hirschmann, 1966
 Halolaelaps sculpturatus Sellnick, 1940
 Halolaelaps sexclavatus (Oudemans, 1902)
 Halolaelaps simplex Willmann, 1957
 Halolaelaps soemermaai (Karg, 1965)
 Halolaelaps strenzkei (Gotz, 1952)
 Halolaelaps subtilis (Leitner, 1946)
 Halolaelaps suecicus Sellnick, 1957
 Halolaelaps tuerkorum (Gotz, 1952)
 Halolaelaps vicinus (Gotz, 1952)

References

Mesostigmata
Articles created by Qbugbot